Markapur is a town in Prakasam district of the Indian state of Andhra Pradesh. It is a Municipality and the headquarters of Markapur mandal in Markapur revenue division. Markapur is notable for the Chennakesava Swamy Temple, built by King Sri Krishnadevaraya. During Ratha Yatra (Tirunalla in Telugu) there occurs a popular carnival; the town is also famous for Chenna Kesavaswamy (Saptavahana Seva) on the day of Rathsapthami, which is attended by thousands of people coming from different parts of the state. It is the third-largest town in Prakasam district after Ongole and Chirala, and it is the main place within West Prakasam district to avail all facilities.

This town formerly was a part of Kurnool District, serving as the east gate of Rayalaseema. The town is close to the Nallamala Hills and currently has a population of nearly 75,000. Markapuram is known for slate manufacturing industries.

On 3 September 2020, Markapur received a historically heavy rainfall measuring 227mm. Due to this weather event, the partially-depleted ground water level increased significantly, leading to a marked decrease in local drought conditions.

History 

The town's name comes from a story of a milk maid by the name of Marika who was graced with a son by swamy Chennakesava. The milk maid, in commemoration of this event, constructed a small temple. Soon afterwards a village grew round and about this temple and was known as Marikapuram. By afflux of time this name evolved into Markapur. The temple, originally constructed by Marika, underwent numerous additions and renovations, the later large and prominent temple being dedicated to Sri Chennakesava.

This town was a part of Kurnool District until 1971. Yerragondapalem, Markapuram, and Giddalur talukas were in Kurnool district until in 1971 a carve out made a new district along with Kanigiri, Podili, Darsi, Kandukur from Nellore District and Ongole and Chirala from Guntur district.

Geography 

An important industry in Markapur is slate manufacturing. It exported slate to other countries in the late 1980s. It is one of the revenue divisions in Prakasam district.

Transport 

Markapuram is located on the Ananthapur–Amaravathi Express Highway, a section of the Expressway Project.

It is a part of the Guntur division of South Central Railway division. The railway line from Vijayawada to Guntakal passes through this station. Markapur is near Srisailam. People visiting Srisailam take the train route  through Markapur railway station. 

Donakonda Airport was used by the British during World War 2 and is also near Markapur.

Education 
The primary and secondary school education is imparted by government in conjunction with private schools, under the School Education Department of the state. Instruction is given in both English and Telugu. 

N.S. Agricultural College is located in Markapur, along with other degree colleges, including engineering. Various coaching institutes are there which help for competitive exams.

References 

Towns in Prakasam district